The 1949–50 Nationalliga A season was the 12th season of the Nationalliga A, the top level of ice hockey in Switzerland. Eight teams participated in the league, and HC Davos won the championship.

First round

Group 1

Group 2

Final round

5th-8th place

Relegation 
 Grasshopper-Club - HC Ambrì-Piotta 3:2

External links
 Championnat de Suisse 1949/50

National League (ice hockey) seasons
Swiss
1949–50 in Swiss ice hockey